Hoplocrepis is a genus of hymenopteran insects of the family Eulophidae.

Species
 Hoplocrepis albiclavus, Ashmead, 1890
 Hoplocrepis bifasciata, Ashmead, 1904
 Hoplocrepis brasiliensis, Ashmead, 1904
 Hoplocrepis grenadensis, Howard, 1897
 Hoplocrepis mexicana, Yefremova, 2003

References
Key to Nearctic eulophid genera
Universal Chalcidoidea Database

Eulophidae